After the Cromwellian conquest of Ireland, the Kingdom of Ireland ceased to operate, and Ireland was governed as part of the Protectorate. The Parliament of Ireland did not meet, and instead, 30 MPs were elected to the Protectorate Parliament in London. The MPs below were preceded by the MPs of the Second Irish House of Commons of Charles I elected in 1639 and succeeded after the Restoration by the MPs of the Irish House of Commons of Charles II elected in 1661.

References

1650s in Ireland
654